José Luis Cilley (born 28 December 1972) is an Argentine former Rugby union footballer. He played as a fly-half with the San Isidro Club. He is the grandson of Jorge Cilley, a former captain of the Pumas.

He had 15 caps for Argentina, from 1994 to 2002, scoring 2 tries, 31 conversions and 22 penalties, in an aggregate of 138 points. He was a member of Argentina squad at the 1995 Rugby World Cup finals, playing in two games and scoring a try, three conversions and five penalties, 26 points in aggregate, and at the 1999 Rugby World Cup finals, but this last time, he didn't play.

External links

1972 births
Living people
Argentine rugby union players
Rugby union fly-halves
Argentine people of British descent
Argentina international rugby union players
San Isidro Club rugby union players
Rugby union players from Buenos Aires